The Men's Individual Time Trial at the 2000 UCI Road World Championships was the 7th edition of the event. The race took place on 12 October 2000 in Plouay, France. The race was won by Serhiy Honchar of Ukraine.

Final classification

References

Men's Time Trial
UCI Road World Championships – Men's time trial